"No Dejemos Que Se Apague" is Wisin & Yandel's lead single from the album Los Vaqueros: El Regreso, released on December 21, 2010. It features American rapper 50 Cent and American singer T-Pain. This is the second time that the duo has worked with 50 Cent and the second time working with T-Pain on a song.

Music video

Development
The music video for the song was filmed in October 2010. It was directed by Jessy Terrero, premiered through their website on December 17, 2010. The music video shows similarity to Lil Wayne's music video for "Got Money" which also features T-Pain, although the video is based on the movie The Town.

Synopsis
The video starts with a man (Adam Rodriguez), later to be known to be a worker of 50 Cent, calling from Los Angeles, California to San Juan, Puerto Rico where Yandel is. It is a job offering when at first he rejects but 50 Cent convinces him. Then it shows that 50 Cent is a common person in a bank and that's where the song starts. Later it is shown that Yandel, with Wisin, in a car driving to the bank. Then they rob the bank with T-Pain. They take a hostage which Yandel is found for. They take her to a van and blindfold the girl. They leave her somewhere and she is questioned by the police. Wisin, Yandel, 50 Cent & T-Pain, with money bags, are shown walking away from the van that they blew up. Later the same girl has memories of Yandel in a laundry shop where she drops her laundry she reaches for it, but then someone else also reaches for it, it is Yandel. The Music video ends showing that the music video was a music video itself.

References

2010 songs
Wisin & Yandel songs
50 Cent songs
T-Pain songs
Music videos directed by Jessy Terrero
Spanglish songs
Songs written by Wisin
Songs written by Yandel
Songs written by T-Pain
Songs written by Nesty (producer)
2010 singles